This is a list of the built-in games included with the Tec Toy Master System Collection 131 video game system released in Brazil in 2011. The collection contains both video games that were previously released for the Sega Master System as well as new titles produced specifically for the system. 

Most of the re-releases emulate their original European version.  However,  Tec Toy has chosen the video game Double Target that was released in Japan over its equivalent Quartet in the United States/Europe.  Alex Kidd BMX Trial and Galactic Protector are the only two games on the compilation that were released exclusively in Japan.  Another game, Sonic Drift 2, was never released at all on the Master System but rather on its derivative the Game Gear handheld console.

See List of Sega Master System games and Lists of video games for related games and lists.

0-9

A

B

C

D

E

F

G

H

I

J

K

L

M

N

O

P

R

S

T

W

 
TecToy